Pushpdan Shambhudan Gadhavi (born 13 December 1940) was a member of the 11th, 12th, 13th & 14th Lok Sabha of India. He represented the Kachchh (Lok Sabha constituency)  of Gujarat and is a member of the Bharatiya Janata Party.

See also
Gadhavi

External links
 Official biographical sketch in Parliament of India website

Gujarati people
Living people
India MPs 2004–2009
1940 births
India MPs 1996–1997
India MPs 1998–1999
India MPs 1999–2004
People from Bhuj
Lok Sabha members from Gujarat
Politicians from Kutch district
Bharatiya Janata Party politicians from Gujarat
Charan